was a Japanese author and Sinologist. He graduated from Keio university. He wrote a number of historical novels, and published a new Japanese translation of Romance of the Three Kingdoms in 1959. In 1951,he won Naoki Prize. He is famous for his novel Nemuri Kyōshirō series.

Novels 
Nemuri Kyōshirō (1956)
Gokenin Zankurō (1976)
Romance of the Three Kingdoms
Water Margin
Unmeitōge
Iesu no Ei (lit. Descendant of Jesus)

Adaptations

Film
 Destiny's Son (1962)
 Enter Kyōshirō Nemuri the Swordman (1963)
 Curse of the Blood (1968)
 Nemuri Kyōshirō manji giri (1969)

References

1917 births
1978 deaths
20th-century Japanese novelists